The British passport (Montserrat) issued to British Overseas Territory Citizens who live in, or have a connection (for example by birth, naturalisation or by descent) with Montserrat. From 2015, all Montserratian passports are issued by HM Passport Office in the United Kingdom. Although Montserrat is a full member of the Caribbean Community, its passport does not conform to the CARICOM passport common design.

Passport statement
Montserratian passports contain on their inside cover the following words in English only:

See also
Visa requirements for British Overseas Territories Citizens of Montserrat

External links

Official website of the Consular Division of the Department of Administration

Montserrat
British passports issued to British Overseas Territories Citizens
Passport